Tylocephalonyx (Greek: "knob" (tylos), "head" (kephalos), "claw/hoof" (onyx)) is an extinct chalicothere from the Miocene of North America.

Description
Tylocephalonyx specimens are notable for a dome-shaped skull, a feature found in some other schizotheriine chalicotheres but most developed in this genus. Adequate fossil material is lacking to tell whether both sexes had domed heads, but sexual dimorphism was common in the group. Tylocephalonyx may have used its "dome" in the same way as the pachycephalosaurs, though there is no clear evidence to link either pachycephalosaurs nor Tylocephalonyx to using their domes to crash together in high-impact head-to-head contests, as in modern bighorn sheep. Such contests require special cranial adaptations to protect the brain and cervical spine, not shown in chalicotheres. The dome of Tylocephalonyx may have been used for visual display or in butting or head-to-body battering contests. 

Tylocephalonyx is a perrisodactyl, related to the modern horse, rhino, and tapir and to the extinct brontotheres.

See also

Moropus
Chalicotherium
Ancylotherium
Kalimantsia

References

Sources
National Geographic Prehistoric Mammals (National Geographic) by Alan Turner
After the Dinosaurs: The Age of Mammals (Life of the Past) by Donald R. Prothero
Classification of Mammals by Malcolm C. McKenna and Susan K. Bell
Late Cretaceous and Cenozoic Mammals of North America: Biostratigraphy and Geochronology by Michael O. Woodburne
Colbert's Evolution of the Vertebrates: A History of the Backboned Animals Through Time by Edwin H. Colbert, Michael Morales, and Eli C. Minkoff
 

Chalicotheres
Miocene odd-toed ungulates
Miocene mammals of North America
Fossil taxa described in 1979